La 1/2 Docena (or La Media Docena) is a Costa Rican comedy group formed by Mario Chacon, Erik Hernández, Edgar Murillo, and Daniel Moreno., they had a Television Series (El Show de la Media Docena) and a Radio Show (Platicomedia), they had also produced two movies (Maikol Yordan de Viaje Perdido, 2014 and Maikol Yordan 2: La Cura Lejana, 2018) and a Christmas Film in 2021 (Mi papá es un santa)

References

External links
Official "La 1/2 Docena" Website
Teletica's Show Website

Costa Rican comedians
Comedy troupes